

This is a list of the National Register of Historic Places listings in Yakima County, Washington.

This is intended to be a complete list of the properties and districts on the National Register of Historic Places in Yakima County, Washington, United States. Latitude and longitude coordinates are provided for many National Register properties and districts; these locations may be seen together in a Google map.

There are 69 properties and districts listed on the National Register in the county. Another property was once listed but has been removed.

Current listings

|}

Former listings

|}

See also

 List of National Historic Landmarks in Washington
 National Register of Historic Places listings in Washington state

References

 
Yakima